Niagara Falls International Airport  is located  east of downtown Niagara Falls, in the Town of Niagara in Niagara County, New York, United States. Owned and operated by the Niagara Frontier Transportation Authority, the airport is a joint civil-military airfield and shares its runways with the Niagara Falls Air Reserve Station. A new terminal building opened in 2009. It is notable for serving vastly more Canadian passengers from over the nearby border than Americans.

History
Niagara Falls International Airport opened in 1928 as a municipal airport with four crushed-stone runways.

During World War II, Bell Aircraft established a large manufacturing plant next to the airport, where during the war it built over 10,000 P-39 Airacobras and P-63 Kingcobras. Bell employed over 28,000 at the plant. After the war, the plant was the development site of the Bell X-1 used by Chuck Yeager to break the sound barrier in 1947.

The United States Army Air Forces assumed jurisdiction of the airport during the war, with the 3522d Army Air Force Base Unit managing the airport and coordinating use of the airfield with Bell Aircraft. The airfield was improved with macadam runways, 4000x150 (N/S), 4000x150 (NE/SW), 4200x300 (E/W), 4000x150 (NW/SE), and added many taxiways and other improvements to handle large numbers of aircraft. Air Technical Service Command also operated an aircraft modification center at the airport where new aircraft were given various updates prior to their deployment to operational bases and overseas combat theaters.

Civilian aviation operations and jurisdiction of the airport was returned in early 1946, and a joint-use agreement was made with the United States Air Force for Air Force Reserve and New York Air National Guard use of a portion of the airport.

Today, the Niagara Falls Air Reserve Station is home to the Air Force Reserve Command's 914th Air Refueling Wing (914 ARW), flying the KC-135R Stratotanker. The wing is operationally gained by the Air Mobility Command (AMC). The main runway was extended to over 9,000 feet (2,743 m) in 1959 to handle larger military aircraft, and was extended again in 2003 to its current length of 9,829 feet (2,996 m). For all practical purposes, the facility is a small Air Force base.

In November 2013 Calspan Air Services became the fixed-base operator for the airport, including refueling, ramp assistance, deicing, transportation and maintenance services.

On August 4, 2014, an Air France Boeing 747-428 flight AF356 from Paris Charles-de-Gaulle was diverted from Toronto due to the temporary closing of Toronto Pearson International Airport. Landing and take-off were on Runway 28R. Niagara Falls gets a large number of Toronto's diversions due to its location and long runways.

Airlines
American Airlines served Niagara Falls until 1956. From 1982 to 1984, Air Niagara, a post-Deregulation airline flew to Newark Airport with Boeing 727-100 jetliners. Empire Airlines also served the airport during the mid-1980's, flying to Syracuse, Long Island, Utica, Elmira, and Boston using both the Fokker F28 Fellowship and Fairchild Swearingen Metroliner. Kiwi International Air Lines briefly served the airport in 1998 with nonstop Boeing 727-200 jet service to Newark Airport (EWR).

In March 2007, Direct Air began flying to Myrtle Beach; Direct Air began flights to Palm Beach International Airport in November 2010. Direct Air's flights to Lakeland Linder International Airport in Lakeland, Florida, started in 2011. Direct Air's service at Niagara Falls International Airport ended on March 12, 2012.

In September 2009, a new terminal complex was completed.

Allegiant Airlines began service in December 2009. They currently serve Punta Gorda (FL), Orlando-Sanford, and St. Petersburg-Clearwater.

In December 2010, Vision Airlines began service to Fort Lauderdale–Hollywood International Airport. According to a USA Today news article dated September 26, 2014, Vision Airlines d/b/a People Express no longer operates any scheduled passenger service.

In January 2011, Spirit Airlines started flights from Niagara Falls International Airport.

In the summer of 2020, due to the COVID-19 pandemic, Allegiant Airlines made the decision to cut the Savannah route. This should not have come as a shock seeing as from 2019 to 2020 this route only carried about 510 passengers.

In October 2020, Spirit Airlines suspended all of their flights from Niagara Falls International Airport. In March 2020, Spirit suspended their flights to Fort Lauderdale. In April, seasonal service to Myrtle Beach began for the season as scheduled. This service was downgraded from the usual Airbus A320, to an Airbus A319. On June 14, service to Myrtle Beach was suspended and service to Fort Lauderdale began again. On June 20, flights to Fort Lauderdale were being operated direct instead of via Plattsburgh. On June 30, flights to Fort Lauderdale were suspended again. Flights to Myrtle Beach resumed on July 6. August 31 marked the day that Spirit suspended all flights and said they would be pulling out of the airport entirely in October. Flights to Fort Lauderdale resumed again for the final time in September on the A320/A320NEO. After nine years of service, the final Spirit Airlines flight to Niagara Falls was on October 6. Spirit has not released any plans to return in the future. However, Spirit still has Niagara Falls listed as a destination on their website.

Facilities
The airport is in Class D airspace and has a FAA control tower.

 6/24: 5,189 x 150 ft (1,582 x 46 m), surface: asphalt
 10L/28R: 9,829 x 150 ft (2,996 x 46 m), surface: asphalt/concrete
 10R/28L: 3,973 x 75 ft (1,211 x 23 m), surface: asphalt

Passenger terminal
On September 2, 2009, Niagara Falls International Airport dedicated its new two-story terminal. With , it has four gates (two jetways and two ground-loading gates), and has room for a Boeing 747 in size. The exterior is designed to reflect Niagara Falls' water flow. Cost was an estimated $42.5 million, $31.5 million for the terminal and $11 million for runway apron and landside improvements.

The previous (old) terminal is now occupied by the Niagara Aerospace Museum, also known as the Ira G. Ross Aerospace Museum.

Airlines and destinations

Passenger

Cargo

Statistics

Top destinations

Nearby airports
 0G0 – North Buffalo Suburban Airport (11 nm E)
 KBUF – Buffalo Niagara International Airport (14 nm SE)
 9G0 – Buffalo Airfield (18 nm SE)
 9G3 – Akron Airport (21 nm E)
 9G6 – Pine Hill Airport (30 nm E)

Source: AirNav

References

External links

Niagara Falls International Airport (official site)
Niagara Frontier Transportation Authority serving Buffalo Niagara
 at New York State DOT website

Airports in New York (state)
Transportation in Niagara Falls, New York
Transportation buildings and structures in Niagara County, New York
1928 establishments in New York (state)